Bacterial leaf scorch (commonly abbreviated BLS, also called bacterial leaf spot) is a disease state affecting many crops, caused mainly by the xylem-plugging bacterium Xylella fastidiosa. It can be mistaken for ordinary leaf scorch caused by cultural practices such as over-fertilization.

Hosts 
BLS can be found on a wide variety of hosts, ranging from ornamental trees (elm, maple, oak) and shrubs, to crop species including blueberry and almond.

Bacterial spot of peppers and tomatoes 
Bacterial spot of peppers and tomatoes is caused by the bacteria Xanthomonas campestris pv. vesicatoria.

Bacterial spot of peaches 
Bacterial spot of peaches is caused by the bacteria Xanthomonas campestris pv. pruni. Spots may form on the leaves and they can be mistaken for peach scab,  which is caused by a fungus.

Bacterial spot of pecans

Symptoms 
An irregular browning leaf margin which may or may not be bordered by a pale halo.

Symptoms re-occur every year, spreading throughout the tree crown, eventually killing the host plant.

Vectors 
Xylem-feeding leafhoppers can transmit the disease bacteria.

Treatment 
There are no known effective treatments for BLS, consequently, removal of affected plants is recommended.

See also 
 Fertilizer burn
 Leaf scorch

References

External links 
 

Bacterial tree pathogens and diseases
Food plant pathogens and diseases
Leaf diseases